Amarcord Nino Rota is an album by various artists, recorded as a tribute to composer Nino Rota.

Background and recording
The album is a tribute to composer Nino Rota and contains adaptations of his compositions for Federico Fellini films. It was the first of producer Hal Willner's tribute albums, and featured then-little-known musicians such as Wynton Marsalis and Bill Frisell. It was recorded in 1981.

Track listing
"Amarcord"	
"Interlude from Juliet of the Spirits"
"8 1/2"
"Theme from La Dolce Vita and Juliet of the Spirits"
"Juliet of the Spirits"
"La Dolce Vita Suite (Introduction/Notturno/Interlude/Valzer [Parlami Di Me])"
"Satyricon"
"Roma"
"Medley: The White Sheik/I Vitelloni/Il Bidone/The Nights of Cabiria"
"La Strada"

Personnel
Tracks 1 and 10
Jaki Byard – piano, arranger
Tracks 2 and 4
Dave Samuels – vibes, arranger
Track 3
Carla Bley – organ, glockenspiel, conductor, arranger
Michael Mantler – trumpet
Gary Valente – trombone
Earl McIntyre – tuba
Gary Windo – tenor sax
Courtenay Wynter – woodwinds
Joe Daley – euphonium
Arturo O'Farrill – piano
Steve Swallow – bass
D. Sharpe – drums
Track 5
Bill Frisell – guitar, arranger
Track 6: part a & c
Sharon Freeman – French horn, piano, arranger 
Francis Haynes – steel drums
Track 6: part b
Muhal Richard Abrams – conductor, arranger
Claudio Roditi – trumpet
Emmet McDonald – trombone
Sharon Freeman – French horn
Henry Threadgill – flute
Bobby Eldridge – baritone sax, clarinet
Jay Hoggard – vibes
Amina Claudine Myers – piano
Fred Hopkins – bass
Warren Smith – drums
Track 6: part d
Michael Sahl – keyboards, co-arranger
Chris Stein – guitar, co-arranger
Deborah Harry – vocals
Charles Rocket – accordion, bells
Lenny Ferrari – drums
Track 7
David Amram – penny whistle, double ocarina, shanai, guitar, claves, arranger
Jerry Dodgion – flute
Sharon Freeman – French horn
Victor Venegas – bass
Ray Mantilla – percussion
Steve Berrios – percussion
Track 8
Steve Lacy – soprano sax, gong, arranger
Track 9
William Fischer – conductor, arranger
Wynton Marsalis – trumpet
George Adams – tenor sax
Branford Marsalis – woodwinds
Kenny Barron – piano
Ron Carter – bass
Wilbert Fletcher – drums

References

1981 albums
Hannibal Records albums